Caladenia falcata, commonly known as the fringed mantis orchid, is a species of orchid endemic to the south-west of Western Australia. It is a relatively common orchid within its natural range and has a single, hairy leaf and one or two green, yellow and red flowers with spreading petals and upswept lateral sepals.

Description 
The flowers are greenish yellow with prominent maroon markings. The lateral sepals and petals have brownish, glandular tips. Flowering occurs from late August to October.

Taxonomy and naming 
This orchid was first formally described by William Nicholls in 1948 from a specimen he collected near Kojonup. Nicholls gave it the name Caladenia dilatata var. falcata and published the description in The Victorian Naturalist. In 1989, Mark Clements and Andrew Brown raised it to species status. The specific epithet (falcata) is a Latin word meaning "sickle-shaped" or "hooked" referring to the upswept lateral sepals.

Distribution and habitat 
Fringed mantis orchid is found between Wongan Hills and Jerramungup in the Avon Wheatbelt, Esperance Plains, Jarrah Forest and Mallee biogeographic regions where it grows in woodland, shrubland or near granite outcrops.

Conservation
Caladenia falcata is classified as "not threatened" by the Western Australian Government Department of Parks and Wildlife.

References 

falcata
Orchids of Western Australia
Endemic orchids of Australia
Plants described in 1948
Endemic flora of Western Australia